Ajume Wingo is a Cameroonian political and social philosopher who is an associate professor at the University of Colorado at Boulder. Much of his work has focused on the analysis of non-liberal or corrupt democratic states with particular focus on contemporary African states. He has also published articles on African art, aesthetics, and culture, often juxtaposing these with western practices and customs.

Background
Hailing from Nso, a kingdom located in the North West Province of Cameroon, Ajume Wingo is a member of the Nso Royal Family. His title Shey Ntumfon (Emissary of the Fon (or King)) charges him with oversight of non-Nso organizations and institutions that enhance the interests of the people of Nso in Cameroon and worldwide.  Wingo received much of his early education from Christian and Muslim missionaries, and from a Bedouin teacher (whose title of Mallam Gargari translates to "invincible teacher") known for his toughness and draconian style of discipline.

He later attended Cameroon College of Arts, Science and Technology (CCAST) Bambili where he studied history, economics and geography and the University of Yaounde where he studied law and economics. Upon emigrating to the United States, he obtained his bachelor's degree from the University of California Berkeley, and received his master's degree and PhD from the University of Wisconsin Madison.

Career
Wingo has been a fellow at the Institute of Race and Social Division, Boston University a visiting assistant professor at Clark University and Emerson College, and an assistant and associate professor of philosophy and senior fellow at the Center for Democracy and Development at the University of Massachusetts Boston. He was also a fellow at the Institute on Race and Social Division, Boston University and a fellow at the W.E.B. Du Bois Institute at Harvard University.

He was an associate of the W.E.B. Du Bois Institute at Harvard and director of the Center for Values and Social Policy at the University of Colorado at Boulder, where he also teaches classes in political and social philosophy as an associate professor.

Bibliography 
 Veil Politics in Liberal Democratic States (2003, Cambridge University Press)
 The Odyssey of Human Rights: Reply to Diagne (2010, Transition)
 The Aesthetics of Freedom (2009, Palgrave Macmillan)
 To Love your Country as your Mother: Patriotism after 9/11 (2007, Theory and Research in Education)
 Akan Philosophy of Personhood (2007, Stanford Encyclopedia of Philosophy)
 The Joy in Living Together: Towards an Appreciation of Laughter (2006, Journal of Political Philosophy)
 Africa at Crossroads: From Subject to Citizen, co-authored with Michael Kruse (2005, Iride)
 The Many Layered Aesthetics of African Art, in Kwasi Wiredu, ed., Companion to African Philosophy (2004, Blackwell)
 Fellowship Associations as a Foundation for Liberal Democracy in Africa in Kwasi Wiredu, ed., Companion to African Philosophy (2004, Blackwell)
 What Makes Liberal Democrats Tick? The Role of Non-Rationality in Liberal Democratic Politics (2003, Politeia)
 Living Legitimacy: A New Approach to Good Government in Africa (2001, New England Journal of Public Policy)
 Good Government is Accountability, in Tedros Kiros, ed., Perspectives in African Politics (2001, Routledge)
 African Art and the Aesthetics of Hiding and Revealing (1998, British Journal of Aesthetics)
 Civic Education: A New Proposal (1997, Studies in Philosophy and Education)

References

External links
 Profile at the University of Colorado, Boulder
 Podcast by Ajume Wingo on "Being a person in West Africa"
 Podcast by Ajume Wingo on "The Arab Spring, Institutional Reform and Leadercentrism"
 African Research and Exchange Academy - AREA Cameroon

Clark University faculty
Year of birth missing (living people)
Political philosophers
Cameroonian emigrants to the United States
University of Wisconsin–Madison alumni
University of California, Berkeley alumni
Boston University faculty
University of Colorado faculty
Harvard University staff
Living people